The Flintshire flag is the flag of the county of Flint. A campaign was launched in September 2012 to have the flag recognised by the Flag Institute, and it was formally adopted on 24 February 2015.



Design

The flag is the banner of the arms anachronistically attributed to Edwin, ruler of the former kingdom of Tegeingl that covered much of the territory of Flintshire.

Those arms bore a black engrailed fleury cross (i.e. a cross capped with fleur-de-lis ends and scalloped edges) on a white field between four choughs, a bird once likely to have been widespread in the area, in black and red. These arms, in a slightly amended form, had been used by the former Flintshire County Council.

The council arms are differenced by the addition of discs on the arms of the cross and a voided diamond (mascle) at the centre. The flag simplifies the design but retains much of the basic symbolism and essential charges of the original arms in a way more suitable for use as a flag.

References

External links
[ Flag Institute – Flintshire]
Flintshire Flag Supporters' Group

History of Flintshire
Flintshire
Flags with crosses
Flintshire